Spilarctia nobilis is a moth in the family Erebidae. It was described by Alfred Jefferis Turner in 1940. It is found in Australia, where it has been recorded from Queensland.

References

N
Moths described in 1940